Peter Woodward (born 24 January 1956) is a British actor, stuntman and screenwriter. He is probably best known for his role as Galen in the Babylon 5 spin-offs Babylon 5: A Call to Arms, Crusade and Babylon 5: The Lost Tales. He is also known for his role as British Army Brigadier General Charles O'Hara in The Patriot.

Early life and education
Woodward was born in London, the second son of actors Venetia Mary Collett (also known as Venetia Barrett) and Edward Woodward. His siblings Tim and Sarah are also actors. He was educated at Haileybury and Imperial Service College before attending the Royal Academy of Dramatic Art (RADA).

Career

Actor
After graduation, he joined the Royal Shakespeare Company, starring in many of their productions including Winter's Tale, Comedy of Errors and A Midsummer Night's Dream. Woodward has also played a wide range of major character roles in films and television including the role of the German Captain Stossel in the feature film The Brylcreem Boys. Woodward voiced the role of Edwin Carbunkle the main villain in the 3D Computer animation children's comedy film Postman Pat: The Movie.

Crusade
As the Techno Mage Galen in the Babylon 5 spin-off Crusade, Woodward played opposite his father in the episode "The Long Road." In the episode, the Excalibur visits a planet that may contain a potent anti-viral agent in its minerals. Earth agencies are strip-mining the planet. Edward Woodward played Alwyn, a rogue Techno Mage living on the planet with its inhabitants who was a friend of Galen's former teacher.

Fight arranger & Conquest
As a former member of the British Academy of Dramatic Combat, Woodward is known in the film industry for his work as a fight arranger. Woodward's dramatic combat training inspired him to study historical weaponry and combat techniques. This interest ultimately led him to create, co-write, and host The History Channel's documentary series Conquest, a hands-on showcase of weapons, training and combat techniques throughout history. The series ran from 2002 to 2003.

Writer
Woodward works a post-production supervisor, writing the additional dialogue recording for films including: Columbus – 1492, Twenty Thousand Leagues Under the Sea, The Scarlet Tunic, Les Misérables and Dangerous Obsessions (1998).

Branching out in the late 1990s, Woodward and his father formed Tripal Productions, for which he wrote and produced his first feature film The House of Angelo, directed by Jim Goddard in 1997 with his father in the starring role as "Angelo". Woodward also wrote the feature film Closing the Ring which was directed by Richard Attenborough.

Filmography

 Wacky Races (2017–2019) as Dick Dastardly
 The Last Scout (2017) as Edward
 Space Dogs Adventure to the Moon (2016) as Dr. Cat
 The Comedian's Guide to Survival (2016) as Morris
 Awaiting (2015) as Jerry
 The Crypt (2014) as Father Antonio
 Postman Pat: The Movie (2014) as Edwin Carbunkle
 Dead Space: Aftermath (2011) as Lead Interrogator
 Eagleheart (2011) as Doolan
 Unthinkable (Direct-to-video) (2010) - Screenwriter
 NCIS (TV series) (2010) as David Devoisier
 Batman: The Brave and the Bold (2010–2011) as Ra's al Ghul
 Fringe (2009) as August (Observer 2)
 National Treasure: Book of Secrets (2008) as Palace Security Guard
 Closing the Ring (2007) - Screenwriter
 Babylon 5: The Lost Tales (direct-to-video) (2007) as Galen
 We Fight to Be Free (2006) as Edward Braddock
 Stargate: Atlantis (TV series) (2005) as Otho
 The True Story of Alexander the Great (TV documentary) (2005) as Host
 Charmed (TV series) (2004–2005) as Aku
 Charmed (TV series) (2002, 2005) as The Source
 Conquest (TV series) (2002-2003) as himself
 Egypt Land of the Gods (TV documentary) (2002) as Host
 Masada (TV documentary) (2002) as Host

 Puckoon (2002) as Col. Martin
 Hard Cash (2002) as Agent Jarvis
 Egypt Beyond the Pyramids (TV documentary) (2001) as Host, also Screenwriter
 Walker, Texas Ranger (TV series) (2001) as Victor Drake
 The Patriot (2000) as British Royal Army Brigadier General Charles O'Hara
 Crusade (1999) as Galen
 Babylon 5: A Call to Arms (1999) as Galen
 Brimstone (1998)
 The Brylcreem Boys (1998)
 The House of Angelo (1997), also Screenwriter
 Gadgetman (1996) (TV)
 Past into Present (1996)
 In Search of Hamlet (1995)
 The Chief (1994)
 Pirates (1994/I) TV Series
 Who Dealt? (1993) (TV)
 Anything More Would Be Greedy (1989) (TV)
 Metal Skin Panic MADOX-01 (1987) (V) (voice)
 Deceptions (1985)(TV)
 The Professionals, Man Called Quinn (1983)
 Fanny by Gaslight (1981) (TV)
 Sense and Sensibility (1981) (TV)
 Testament of Youth (1979) (TV)The Comedy of Errors (1978/I) (TV)

 Enemy at the Door'' V for Victory (1978) as Hans Kurtmeier

References

External links

Official website

1956 births
Living people
Alumni of RADA
British male voice actors
British people of English descent
English male film actors
English male screenwriters
English male television actors
English screenwriters